The Apostolic Vicariate of the London District was an ecclesiastical jurisdiction of the Roman Catholic Church in England and Wales. It was led by a vicar apostolic who was a titular bishop. The apostolic vicariate was created in 1688 and was dissolved in 1850 and its former area was replaced by the episcopal sees of Westminster and Southwark.

Background 
Soon after the accession of Queen Elizabeth I, in 1559, the bishops of England and Wales were forced to choose between taking the Oath of Supremacy, thus denying the authority of the Pope, and losing their episcopal sees. Those who chose to continue their allegiance to Rome were subsequently deposed and replaced in their sees by priests of the Church of England. Most of the deposed Bishops were imprisoned in various locations and died in captivity over a period of years, though some left the country and continued their work overseas. The last of the deposed bishops was Thomas Goldwell, Bishop of St Asaph, who died in Rome on April 3, 1585.

Apostolic Vicariate of England 
In 1623, after 65 years of formal absence from England and Wales, Pope Urban VIII appointed a bishop with actual jurisdiction in England. His choice fell upon William Bishop, who was given the title of Apostolic Vicar of England. Bishop landed secretly in England at midnight on 31 July 1623, but was to die only nine months later.

Bishop was succeeded in office by Richard Smith, also ordained a bishop, who arrived in England in April 1625. However, two warrants were issued for Smith's arrest in August 1631, and he was forced to resign and flee to France, where he eventually died in Paris in 1655. After 1631, there was no Roman Catholic bishop in England for another 54 years, and the void was to some extent filled by a dean and chapter of rather unsure legal status, first established by Bishop and confirmed by Smith.

It was only in 1685 that a successor was appointed by Rome, in the person of John Leyburn, a Doctor of Divinity of the Sorbonne and a former President of the English College at Douai, who was consecrated bishop in Rome on 9 September 1685. In 1623, Bishop had divided England into six areas, at the head of each of which he placed a superior with the title of vicar general, and this had remained the system thereafter. Leyburn reduced these six areas to four. In the summer of 1687 he toured the North of England and confirmed over 20,000 Catholics there.

Apostolic Vicariate of the London District 
On 30 January 1688, the number of bishops in England and Wales was increased by the Pope to four vicars apostolic, as a result of which the single apostolic vicariate was divided into the London District, the Midland District, the Northern District and the Western District. The first vicar apostolic of the London District was Bishop John Leyburn, who had previously since 24 August 1685 served as Vicar Apostolic of England. In 1688, the Apostolic Vicariate of London also became responsible for Catholics in the British colonies of the New World. This ended in Newfoundland on 30 May 1784 with the creation of the Apostolic Prefecture of Newfoundland, and in the United States on 26 November 1784 with the creation of the Apostolic Prefecture of the United States. 
Although the vicariates as a whole were later more finely divided over the years, and notwithstanding intermittent persecution, an Apostolic Vicariate of the London District continued in existence until on 29 September 1850 when Pope Pius IX issued the bull Universalis Ecclesiae, by which thirteen new dioceses were created, among them the metropolitan Diocese of Westminster, a new jurisdiction which formally replaced part of the previous vicariate. At the same time, the remainder of the London District became the suffragan Diocese of Southwark.

The last Apostolic Vicar of the London District was Bishop Nicholas Wiseman (d. 1865), who on 29 September 1850 was assigned the title of Metropolitan Archbishop of Westminster. The following day he was created a cardinal. The district ceased to be missionary territory and exempt, its prelate becoming the head of the new English ecclesiastical province.

List of Apostolic Vicars of the London District

See also 
 Religion in the United Kingdom
 Roman Catholicism in England and Wales
 Roman Catholicism in the United Kingdom
 Lists of office-holders
 Apostolic Prefecture of the United States
 Roman Catholic Archdiocese of Baltimore (United States)

References

Bibliography

External links 
 GigaCatholic (Westminster archdiocese) with incumbent biography links

History of Catholicism in England
London
London
London
Catholic Church in London
Roman Catholic Diocese of Westminster
Roman Catholic Archdiocese of Southwark